Sejad Halilović (born 16 March 1969) is a Bosnian former professional footballer who played for several clubs throughout Europe, including Dinamo Zagreb, Real Valladolid and Hapoel Be'er Sheva.

In addition, he played one game for the Croatia national team before Bosnia and Herzegovina gained independence and represented Bosnia and Herzegovina after they gained independence.

Playing career

Club
Halilović began his professional career in the Croatian team Cibalia. During the two years played Halilović 46 games and scored 4 goals.

In 1992, Halilović signed for Croatia Zagreb (now Dinamo Zagreb) for three seasons, during which he won the Croatian First Football League and Croatian Football Cup. During those three seasons, Halilović played 59 games and scored 9 goals.

During the summer of 1995, Halilović joined Real Valladolid, but after a season where he played 17 times and did not find the net, Halilović moved on to Hapoel Be'er Sheva. Halilović played a significant part in the team that won the Israel State Cup final after defeating Maccabi Tel Aviv F.C. 1-0. During the summer of 1997, Halilović moved to the Turkish Süper Lig and played for three years for two different teams.

In 2000, Halilović returned to the Croatian First Football League for one season and signed for NK Osijek, but played only 8 games.

In season 2001/2002 Halilović returned once again to Israel and played for Hapoel Rishon LeZion F.C., where he helped the team stay in the Premier League.

After playing for other teams in Croatia, Halilović retired from professional football in 2004 while at NK Ljubljana.

International
On 17 August 1994, Halilović played for Croatia against Israel at the Ramat Gan Stadium. The game ended in victory for Croatia.

He then switched allegiance and made his debut for Bosnia and Herzegovina in an October 1996 FIFA World Cup qualification match in Bologna, ironically against his former representative team Croatia, and has earned a total of 15 caps, scoring no goals. His final international was a January 2000 friendly match against Qatar.

Managerial career
Halilović, started in 2008 to train the youth department of Dinamo Zagreb but left in 2014 because of his son Alen Halilović signed for FC Barcelona.

Personal life
Halilović is an ethnic Bosniak. During the Bosnian War in 1992 as a professional player, he moved to Vinkovci, then to Zagreb where he met his Croatian wife Vanessa. His son Alen is a professional footballer who has represented the Croatia national football team. His other two sons, Dino Halilović and Damir Halilović, are also professional players.

Honours

Club

Croatia Zagreb
Croatian League: 1992-93
Croatian Cup: 1993-94

Hapoel Be'er Sheva
Israel State Cup: 1996–97

References

External links
 

1969 births
Living people
People from Doboj
Bosniaks of Bosnia and Herzegovina
Bosniaks of Croatia
Croatian Muslims
Association football midfielders
Yugoslav footballers
Croatian footballers
Bosnia and Herzegovina footballers
Croatia international footballers
Bosnia and Herzegovina international footballers
Dual internationalists (football)
HNK Cibalia players
GNK Dinamo Zagreb players
Real Valladolid players
Hapoel Be'er Sheva F.C. players
Kardemir Karabükspor footballers
Altay S.K. footballers
NK Osijek players
Hapoel Rishon LeZion F.C. players
HNK Rijeka players
NK Ljubljana players
ND Mura 05 players
Yugoslav Second League players
Croatian Football League players
La Liga players
Israeli Premier League players
Süper Lig players
Liga Leumit players
Slovenian PrvaLiga players
Croatian expatriate footballers
Bosnia and Herzegovina expatriate footballers
Expatriate footballers in Spain
Bosnia and Herzegovina expatriate sportspeople in Spain
Expatriate footballers in Israel
Bosnia and Herzegovina expatriate sportspeople in Israel
Expatriate footballers in Turkey
Bosnia and Herzegovina expatriate sportspeople in Turkey
Expatriate footballers in Slovenia
Bosnia and Herzegovina expatriate sportspeople in Slovenia